McBee is a surname. Notable people with the surname include:

Cecil McBee (born 1935), American jazz musician
Deron McBee (born 1961), American actor
Lee McBee (1951–2014), American blues musician and singer
Pryor McBee (1901–1963), American baseball player
Rives McBee (born 1938), American golfer
Thomas Page McBee, American author
Vardry McBee (1775–1864), American businessman, philanthropist and city founder

See also
McBee, South Carolina
Royal McBee, early computer manufacturer
McBee cards, pre-electronic technique for data storage and retrieval